The Holocaust in Germany was the systematic persecution, deportation, imprisonment, and murder of Jews in Germany as part of the Europe-wide Holocaust perpetrated by Nazi Germany. The term typically refers only to the areas that were part of Germany prior to the Nazi regime coming to power and excludes some or all of the territories annexed by Nazi Germany, such as Austria or the Protectorate of Bohemia and Moravia.

Overall, of the 522,000 Jews living in Germany in January 1933, approximately 304,000 emigrated during the first six years of Nazi rule and about 214,000 were left on the eve of World War II. Of these, 160,000-180,000 were killed as a part of the Holocaust. On May 19, 1943, only about 20,000 Jews remained and Germany was declared judenrein.

References

Sources

Further reading

 
Germany